Sighthill may refer to:

 Sighthill, Edinburgh, a district of the city of Edinburgh
Sighthill Stadium, a proposed stadium in Sighthill, Edinburgh
 Sighthill, Glasgow, a housing estate in the Springburn district of the city of Glasgow